Sacred Heart Church, Chandannagar (l'Eglise du Sacré Cœur) is a heritage church situated at Chandannagar in Hooghly district of Indian state of West Bengal. Presently the church is under the supervision of West Bengal Heritage Commission. It's structure is an authentic expression of French architectural style in India.

History
The Sacred Heart Church was inaugurated on 27 January 1884 by Mr. Paul Goethals, the Archbishop of Calcutta. The construction started in 1875, during the rule of French East India Company in Chandannagar, and was completed in 1884 at the instance of Rev. M. Barthet, assisted by his brother Joachim. It is designed by French Architect Jacques Duchatz.

References

External links
  

Buildings and structures in Hooghly district
Tourist attractions in Hooghly district
Churches in West Bengal
1884 establishments in the French colonial empire
Churches completed in 1884
Chandannagar